Karimabad-e Olya (also Romanized as Karīmābād-e ‘Olyā; also known as Karīmābād-e Bālā and Karim Abad Olya Hoomeh) is a village in Kabutar Khan Rural District, in the Central District of Rafsanjan County, Kerman Province, Iran. At the 2006 census, its population was 1,515, in 360 families.

References 

Populated places in Rafsanjan County